"Til I Die" is a song by American rock band the Beach Boys from their 1971 album Surf's Up, subsequently issued as the B-side of the single "Long Promised Road". With autobiographical lyrics about death and hopelessness, it is one of the few songs in which both the words and music were written solely by Brian Wilson. An extended mix of the original recording, created by engineer Stephen Desper, was included on the 1998 Endless Harmony Soundtrack.

Background and composition 
Brian Wilson reportedly wrote Til I Die" while suffering from an existential crisis, having recently threatened to drive his car off the Santa Monica pier and ordered his gardener to dig a grave in his backyard. According to biographer David Leaf, these episodes were treated as jokes by Wilson's family and friends. In a November 1970 interview, Wilson discussed his daily routine of "go[ing] to bed in the early hours of the morning and sleep[ing] until the early afternoon". He added: "I'm not unhappy with life; in fact I'm quite happy living at home."  According to Wilson's (since-discredited) 1991 autobiography Wouldn't It Be Nice: My Own Story, the song was inspired by a late night trip to the beach:

The song was written over the course of several weeks as Wilson tried to express the feelings he had experienced on that night he had spent alone at the beach. As he explains, "I struggled at the piano, experimenting with rhythms and chord changes, trying to emulate in sound the ocean's shifting tides and moods as well as its sheer enormity. I wanted the music to reflect the loneliness of floating a raft in the middle of the Pacific. I wanted each note to sound as if it was disappearing into the hugeness of the universe.

Explaining how Wilson came up with the chords, Don Was recalled, "he told me that he was sitting at a piano, creating geometric patterns with his fingers, trying not to move the fingers on the outside of the patterns, but limiting changes to internal movements. When he landed on a shape that both looked cool and sounded good, he wrote it down. So, essentially he created this masterpiece by contorting his fingers into really groovy shapes." However, Was said, "I've absolutely no idea whether this story has any basis in truth or whether he was just making it up on the spot to entertain me."

Asked how he came up with the song in a 2007 interview, Wilson answered, "Well, I put a b note in g major 7th chord and it was a 3rd in the chord, and the note in the key of g resonates pretty well. Lyrically, I tried to put nature in there. Earth, water, rocks and leaves." He stated that the line "I'm a cork on the ocean" was the first thing lyrically that came to him. In the lyrics, Wilson compares himself to a cork on the ocean, a rock in a landslide, and a leaf on a windy day—seeing himself as a small, helpless object, being moved inconceivable distances by forces beyond his comprehension. "How deep is the ocean? How long will the wind blow?" The hopeless conclusion is given in the song's title.

Recording 
Wilson recorded a solo piano demo of the song on November 4, 1969. According to some sources, when he presented the song to the band, one member initially voiced criticisms. Bruce Johnston remembered Brian "playing it for the band and one member of the band didn't understand it and put it down, and Brian just decided not to show it to us for a few months. He just put it away. I mean, he was absolutely crushed. This other person just didn't like it." Various sources state that Mike Love had called the song a "downer". Engineer Stephen Desper wrote that "the guys often thought the original lyrics to ['Til I Die] were drug derived." At one stage, to address the criticism, Wilson changed the lyrics from "It kills my soul" to "It holds me up" or "It fills my soul" and "I lost my way" to "I found my way". Ultimately, the rest of the group insisted that the original lyrics be kept as the new lyrics contradicted the lyrics in the verses. A recording of the song with these alternate lyrics still exists, and was released on the 2021 compilation Feel Flows.

The first dated session for the song was at Beach Boys Studio on August 15, 1970.  The last dated session occurred on July 30, 1971. In Desper's recollection, Wilson played Hammond B3 organ while touring musician Daryl Dragon played vibraphone.

Al Jardine said of the song, "it's really a good vocal sound, I think Desper deserves all the credit on that one, I mean we just had the best microphones, the best microphone technique and engineering on that particular piece and that particular time." Johnston expressed similar feelings towards the song as he states that "the track is very simple...and the great, great vocal arrangement that he wrote. Really, a great piece of work."

An extended mix of the original recording, created by Desper, was included on the 1998 Endless Harmony Soundtrack. It is notable for having each instrumental layer come in after the other as an introduction and features more prominent vibraphone and organ throughout. The mix was reportedly done only for the engineer's self-interest. As Desper explains, the band "went out for lunch or something like that and since the song was already mounted and a mix up, I put together what I thought was a structure that better showcased the harmonic beauty of Brian's writing. Somewhere thereafter I did play the track for Carl, but only in the interest of disclosure, not to sway him to change the structure that Brian intended."

Release  
The song was first released on the band's album Surf's Up on August 30, 1971. On October 11, 1971, the song was released in the United States as the flip-side of the "Long Promised Road" single, which had also been released earlier that year in May with a different B-side. The single entered the Billboard charts on October 30 in the No. 93 position. It peaked three weeks later at No. 89 on the Billboard charts, where it remained for one more week until the single dropped off the charts altogether. It was the first single by the group in 19 months to chart. However, at the time it was the lowest charting single in the group's history and it remained so for a further eighteen years.

Legacy and recognition
Bruce Johnston praised it as the last great Brian Wilson song as well as describing it as Wilson's "heaviest song." Johnston has also stated that "the words absolutely fit his mindset". Wilson also felt this was the case when he stated that "the song summed up everything I had to say at the time." In 2015, Love named the lyrics of Til I Die" his favorite of any written solely by Wilson, although he admitted, "I don't like the line 'it kills my soul' but I understand what he's saying." Biographer Jon Stebbins wrote: Til I Die' proves that Brian could not only write beautiful music, but that he had the ability to communicate honestly and artfully with his lyrics as well. The track is decorated with a haunting vibraphone and organ bed, which frames the strong harmony vocal arrangement perfectly."

As a solo artist, a remake of the song was recorded – along with an accompanying video – by Brian Wilson for inclusion in the 1995 documentary I Just Wasn't Made for These Times and it would later appear on the film's soundtrack. This version, produced by Brian and Don Was, is much more sparse than the original. Brian's re-recording of the song was released as the second track on a relatively rare UK single in 1995. However, the single failed to make any impact on the charts. In 2000, over a period of two days on April 7 and 8, Brian and his band recorded a live version of the song—based on Desper's extended mix—for inclusion on Brian's 2000 live album Live at the Roxy Theatre.

A sample of the song appears as part of the soundtrack to the 2014 film Love & Mercy on the track "The Bed Montage", composed by Atticus Ross.

Personnel
Credits from Craig Slowinski

The Beach Boys
Al Jardine - backing vocals
Bruce Johnston - backing vocals, Hammond organ
Mike Love - lead and backing vocals
Brian Wilson - lead and backing vocals, Hammond organ, Rocksichord, snare drum, Maestro Rhythm King MRK-2 drum machine
Carl Wilson - lead and backing vocals, acoustic guitar

Additional musicians
Daryl Dragon - bass guitar, vibraphone
Stephen W. Desper - Moog synthesizer

Cover versions 

1992 – Downy Mildew, "Elevator" EP
1993 – Medicine, "Never Click" single
1996 – The Josephine Wiggs Experience, Bon Bon
1997 – The Wilsons, The Wilsons (co-produced by Brian)
1997 – The Elements, Wouldn't It Be Nice: A Jazz Portrait of Brian Wilson
1997 – Clark Burroughs Group, Wouldn't It Be Nice: A Jazz Portrait of Brian Wilson
2000 – Christy McWilson, The Lucky One.
2002 – Doug Powell, Making God Smile: An Artists' Tribute to the Songs of Beach Boy Brian Wilson.
2005 – Barenaked Ladies, performing an acoustic version of the song at a MusiCares concert honoring Brian Wilson. This performance was later released on DVD.
2006 – Marty Rudnick, More Songs About Cars and Girls.
2010 – Lightspeed Champion, Bye Bye EP
2013 – Chris Schlarb, Psychic Temple II (features Sufjan Stevens and Ikey Owens)

References 

1971 singles
The Beach Boys songs
Brian Wilson songs
Songs about death
Songs about loneliness
Songs written by Brian Wilson
Song recordings produced by Brian Wilson
Song recordings produced by the Beach Boys
1971 songs